Giorgi Khmaladze is a Georgian architect graduated in Architecture from the Tbilisi State Academy of Arts, and a Master of Architecture by the Harvard Graduate School of Design in 2012.

Career

Giorgi Khmaladze heads Giorgi Khmaladz Architects which acts in all areas of architectural design and in its most varied scales: objects, interiors, architecture and cities.

Awards

  ArchDaily's Building of the Year Award 2014 - Commercial Architecture - Fuel Station + McDonalds.
 ArchiAwards 2012 – Best Housing Project - Singapore Waterfront.
 Georgian International Awards 2010 – Best Public Interior - Prego Restaurant.

Selected projects

Some of his best-known works are the Georgian National Pavilion for the Shanghai Expo 2010 and the Fuel Station + McDonalds in Batumi, Georgia

References

External links
 Giogi Khmakadze Architects
 Giogi Khmakadze

Living people
Architects from Georgia (country)
Tbilisi State Academy of Arts alumni
Harvard Graduate School of Design alumni
Year of birth missing (living people)